Vezza d'Alba is a comune in the Piedmont region of Italy. It is in the province of Cuneo, and is 65km north east of the town of Cuneo. 

Vezza was first recorded in the 10th century, as a territory of the Diocese of Asti and later passed to the Roero family who built the castle at Guarene.

Twin towns — sister cities
Vezza d'Alba is twinned with:

  Jonquières-Saint-Vincent, France

References

Cities and towns in Piedmont
Roero